Peter Townend may refer to:

Peter Townend (novelist) (1935–1999), British novelist, thriller writer, photographer and journalist
Peter Townend (surfer) (born 1953), Australian surfer
Peter Townend (editor) (1921–2001), social editor and genealogist

See also
Pete Townshend (born 1945), British rock guitarist of the band The Who
Peter Townsend (disambiguation)